The Société des Anc. Établissements Luc Court et Cie was a French automobile manufactured in Lyon from 1899 until 1936.

Early models had a distinctive "demountable chassis".  Designed by one Lacoin, the front part of the chassis could be removed from the bodywork and rear wheels; this could then be attached to a different body and wheels.  The transformation was advertised as "taking place within a few minutes, without tools".  1912 saw the company produce a range of three cars, fours of 2155 cc and 3631 cc and a six of 3233 cc.  The company continued production of passenger vehicles until shortly before World War II; after the war, it built mostly light commercial vehicles, as well as a few 12 hp and 20 hp cars.

See also
Article with pictures of the "demountable chassis"

References

Defunct motor vehicle manufacturers of France
Manufacturing companies based in Lyon